State Route 334 (SR 334), also known as Louisville Road, is 2.5 mile long north-south state highway in Blount County, Tennessee. It serves as a connector between the town of Louisville and the city of Alcoa.

Route description

SR 334 begins in northern Alcoa at an intersection with SR 335 (W Hunt Road), where the road continues south as Louisville Road into downtown. It heads northwest through suburban areas before entering farmland while passing along the southern edge of McGhee Tyson Airport. The highway continues northwest through farmland to enter Louisville and come to a roundabout with Miser Station Road and Mentor Road. SR 334 continues northwest through neighborhoods before coming to an end at an intersection with SR 333 (Louisville Road/Topside Road). The entire route of SR 334 is a two-lane highway.

Major intersections

References

334
Transportation in Blount County, Tennessee